Charlie Abel (born in Australia) is an Australian rugby union player who currently plays for the Chicago Hounds in Major League Rugby (MLR). His playing position is at prop.

He previously played for the LA Giltinis in the MLR and an injury cover for the NSW Waratahs in Super Rugby.

Super Rugby statistics

Reference list

External links
Rugby.com.au profile
itsrugby.co.uk profile

Australian rugby union players
Living people
Rugby union props
New South Wales Waratahs players
Year of birth missing (living people)
Melbourne Rebels players
New South Wales Country Eagles players
Expatriate rugby union players in the United States
Australian expatriate rugby union players
Australian people of New Zealand descent
LA Giltinis players
Sydney (NRC team) players
Rugby union players from Melbourne
Auckland rugby union players
Chicago Hounds (rugby union) players